"Hell Naw" is the lead single from Nasty C's debut album, Bad Hair. The song talks about him not quitting the music industry. It debuted at number 4 on South Africa's official music chart. The song peaked at number 1 on The Beat 99.9 FM African Top 10 chart. It was made available for free digital download and has been downloaded over 11,000 times.

Background
Nasty C told Mac G from 94.7 FM that he wrote the song and released it within 24 hours. Moreover, he said he started writing bars while listening to a beat he had produced earlier.

Music video
The music video for "Hell Naw" was shot by Teddy Maxx and edited by Nasty C and Pierre. Nasty C assisted Teddy Maxx with directing it.

Covers
J'Something, Mi Casa's lead vocalist, celebrated Youth Day by performing a cover of the song in June 2016. In July 2016, Nigerian rapper Hotyce released a cover of "Hell Naw", with production assistance from Emmeno.

Accolades 
"Hell Naw" won Best Song of The Year at the 16th Metro FM Music Awards.

Charts

Weekly charts

References

External links

2016 singles
2016 songs
Nasty C songs